Bình Liêu is a rural district of Quảng Ninh province in the northeastern region of Vietnam. As of 2003 the district had a population of 26,077 . The district covers an area of 471 km2. The district capital lies at Bình Liêu.

Administrative divisions
Bình Liêu, Húc Động, Đồng Tâm, Tình Húc, Vô Ngại, Lục Hồn, Đồng Văn.

References

Districts of Quảng Ninh province